Loch of Skene is a large lowland, freshwater loch in Aberdeenshire, Scotland.

The loch is partially man-made, being dammed at its outflow on the southern shore to form a reservoir. Before 1905, water from the loch was used in the making of tweed and to turn the mill wheel at the Garlogie Mills. When the mills closed in 1905 the water was used to generate electricity. The loch is about 6 foot deep at its deepest.

Flora and fauna
The loch is designated as a Special Protection Area,  a Site of Special Scientific Interest and a Ramsar site for wildlife conservation purposes.

The loch supports concentrations of wildfowl in autumn and winter in particular greylag geese, goldeneye ducks and pink-footed geese.  Common gulls are also found on the loch.
          
Reedbed and a birch and willow carr fringe the loch perimeter.

Pike are found in the loch and a permit is required for fishing.

Recreation
The Aberdeen and Stonehaven Yacht Club is based at the loch.

Survey
The loch was surveyed on 17 July 1905 by T.N. Johnston and L.W. Collett and later charted  as part of the Sir John Murray's Bathymetrical Survey of Fresh-Water Lochs of Scotland 1897-1909.

References

Special Protection Areas in Scotland
Ramsar sites in Scotland
Sites of Special Scientific Interest in Gordon and Aberdeen
Skene
Skene
Dee Basin